Patrick Curtis (June 15, 1939 – November 24, 2022) was an American film producer, best known for his association with Raquel Welch, whom he married on February 14, 1967 and divorced on January 6, 1972. Curtis was instrumental in promoting Welch's career, producing a number of movies starring her.

Curtis was cast in the uncredited part of Baby Beau Wilkes in Gone with the Wind in 1939. His uncle was film director Billy Wilder.

Curtis died on November 24, 2022, at the age of 83. His Gone with the Wind co-star, Mickey Kuhn, died four days prior to him.

Select credits
A Swingin' Summer (1965) – associate producer
The Sorcerers (1967) – producer
The Beloved (1970) – producer
Raquel! (1970) (TV special) – producer
Hannie Caulder (1971) – producer
J-Men Forever (1975) – producer
The Avenging Angel (1995) – producer
Meanwhile, Back at the Ranch (2012) – producer

Unmade projects
O'Hooligan's Mob (1971) – to direct

References

External links

Patrick Curtis at BFI

1939 births
2022 deaths
American film producers